Melanie Carpenter (April 22, 1971 – January 6, 1995) was a Canadian 23-year-old woman who was abducted and murdered in British Columbia, on January 6, 1995. Carpenter was taken from her workplace in Surrey and found dead in the Fraser Canyon several weeks later. The prime suspect, Fernand Auger, committed suicide before he could be arrested.

Disappearance
On January 6, 1995, Melanie Carpenter, a 23-year-old woman from Surrey, British Columbia, had received suspicious phone calls from a man feigning interest in a business deal. Later that day, Carpenter was abducted from where she was working alone at a tanning salon in the Fleetwood town centre of Surrey.

Investigation
The afternoon that Carpenter went missing, a bank security camera recorded a 37-year-old man, Fernand Auger, making a $300 withdrawal using Carpenter's debit card, and the footage was shown on national TV the next day. Auger was a drifter from Ontario, frequently working as a waiter in restaurants, and had been a resident of Calgary, Alberta, until moving to British Columbia days before the murder. In August 1994, Auger had been released from prison in Bowden, Alberta, where he had served a 16-month sentence for armed robbery, and was on parole at the time. Auger quickly became the number one suspect in the abduction, and a warrant was issued for his arrest.

Auger had committed suicide in a garage on the property by inhaling carbon monoxide fumes from the engine of his car, a Hyundai Excel rented from Calgary.

Carpenter's body had been abandoned in a crevice and concealed by a white blanket.

Aftermath
In 1995, the Melanie Carpenter Foundation was established to create a memorial for Carpenter. After her death, Carpenter's father formed a petition to keep murderers in prison as speeches were made, petitions were signed and rallies were held in protest against Canada's parole system.

See also
List of kidnappings
List of solved missing person cases
List of unsolved murders

References

1990s missing person cases
1995 murders in Canada
1995 in British Columbia
Canadian murder victims
Female murder victims
Formerly missing people
History of British Columbia
January 1995 events in Canada
Kidnapped Canadian people
Missing person cases in Canada
Murder in British Columbia
Murder–suicides in Canada
Unsolved murders in Canada
Violence against women in Canada
Women in British Columbia